This Is The Army is an American musical revue in two acts, designed to boost morale in the U.S. during World War II, with a book by James McColl and music and lyrics by Irving Berlin. It was produced by the U.S. army on Broadway in 1942, with a cast of U.S. soldiers, for the benefit of the Army Emergency Relief Fund.

Production
The revue ran on Broadway, at the Broadway Theatre from July 4, 1942, to September 26, 1942, for 113 performances. The show was directed by Sgt. Ezra Stone, choreographed by Cpl. Nelson Barclift and Pvt. Robert Sidney, with settings and costumes by Pvt. John Koenig and music direction by Cpl. Chester O'Brien. However, the opening night program states that the orchestra was under the direction of Cpl. Milton Rosenstock.

Background
In May 1941, ex-Sergeant Irving Berlin was on tour at Camp Upton, his old Army base in Yaphank, New York, before the U.S. joined the fighting in World War II. There he spoke with the commanding officers, including Capt. Doc Rankin of Special Services, about restaging Berlin's 1917 Army play Yip Yip Yaphank. Gen. George Marshall approved a Broadway production of a wartime musical for the army, allowing Berlin to make the arrangements and hold rehearsals at Camp Upton much like he had done during World War I. Sgt. Ezra Stone was selected as director for the new version of the play, and the two set up on base during the weekdays to put together the story and crew.

Insisting on racial integration, Berlin was permitted to add African Americans into this play, which he was not allowed to do in Yip Yip Yaphank. This was unconventional for the United States Army. Still, whites and African Americans did not appear on stage simultaneously. According to the opening night program, the show opened with a military minstrel show. Prologue Magazine reports that "initially, [Berlin] expected the first half hour of This Is the Army to recreate a minstrel show, which was the way he had kicked off Yip  Yip  Yaphank – 110 men sitting on bleachers, and everyone in blackface. Ezra Stone, the director, was indignant. 'Mr. Berlin,' he said, 'I know the heritage of the minstrel show. Those days are gone. People don't do that anymore.' 'No, no, that's nonsense,' the songwriter replied. After considerable discussion, Stone adopted another approach to convince Berlin to skip the minstrel segment: 'How can we have 110 guys in blackface and then get them out of blackface for the rest of the show?' So Berlin devised a song for the Black soldiers, based on "Puttin' on the Ritz", calling it "What the Well-Dressed Man in Harlem Will Wear".

Production and reception

The opening night cast consisted of 300 actors including Berlin, Burl Ives, and Stone (the director). The show was a great success, with an opening night gross of $45,000, which, according to The New York Times, "probably is a world's record for an opening night." It was supposed to run for four weeks (to August 4, 1942) and instead ran for 12 weeks (to September 26, 1942). The New York Times article went on to say "it became evident to all concerned that there was the best show of a generation." Brooks Atkinson, writing in The New York Times a month later, said, "No wonder This Is the Army leaves the audience in a glow of enjoyment and loyalty. For Mr. Berlin's taste is perfect ... he has contributed another memorable show to the genius of America."

Touring company

Because the show was such a success, it went on the road. The first national tour of the revue went to Washington and Philadelphia before continuing to Baltimore, Boston, Cleveland, Cincinnati, St. Louis, Detroit, and Chicago, and Los Angeles, ending in San Francisco, California, on February 13, 1943. By that time, it had earned $2 million (equal to $ today) for the Army Emergency Relief Fund. The company of men that staged the play were the only Army outfit to be fully integrated, but only so off-stage.

The show toured the UK in 1943, appearing at the London Palladium from 10 to 27 November, before playing at the Glasgow Empire for a week from 30 November. Irving Berlin still appeared, but some numbers were changed for the UK production. Musical director was Milton Rosenstock. In the "well dressed man in Harlem" section James Cross danced with Billy Yates. According to a note in the Glasgow programme written by Jacob L Devers, the 150-strong American soldier cast, "following their tour of Great Britain... will be sent to Africa to play before Allied soldiers, then will join America's fighting forces". Proceeds of the British tour were given to British service charities, and it was also a stipulation that "the soldiers of our Allies, as well as all American enlisted men, should see this Army show free of cost."

The end of the war saw the end of the roadshow, the last performance being on the island of Maui, Hawaii, on October 22, 1945, with Irving Berlin once again singing his "Oh! How I Hate to Get Up in the Morning". The Army Emergency Relief Fund collected millions of dollars, but the total amount was never accounted for, nor released to the public.

Musical numbers
(according to the opening night program)
Act I
1. A Military Minstrel Show
a. "Opening Chorus"
b. "This Is the Army"
c. "I'm Getting Tired So I Can Sleep"
d. "My Sergeant and I"
e. "I Left My Heart at the Stage Door Canteen"
f. "The Army’s Made a Man Out of Me"
g. "Mandy"
2. A Military Vaudeville Show
3. "Ladies of the Chorus"
4. "That Russian Winter"
5. "What the Well Dressed Man in Harlem Will Wear"
6. "Finale Act I"

Act II
1. "American Eagles"
2. "Head in the Clouds"
3.  "Reprise - "I'm Getting Tired"
4. "Stage Door Canteen"
5. "Aryans Under the Skin"
6. "A Soldier’s Dream"
7. "Oh! How I Hate to Get Up in the Morning"
8. "This Time"

References

Sources
Mantle, Burns (ed.) The Best Plays of 1942–1943, Dodd, Mead & Company, New York, 1943.
Ewen, David. Complete Book of the American Musical Theater, (2nd Ed.) Henry Holt and Company, New York, 1959, pp. 27–29.

External links

This Is The Army at Playbill

Musicals by Irving Berlin
Broadway musicals
1942 musicals